Shin-Kiba 1st Ring is an arena in Tokyo, which holds 290 people. It was opened in 2001, its first event being a JDStar "Grapple Beauty" show, even though the inside of the building was not even close to being completed. It has quickly become a favorite of smaller promotions, for its cheap rental prices and the close proximity that it has to Shin-Kiba Station, and the train lines.

Japanese all women's professional wrestling promotion World Wonder Ring Stardom holds a lot of their events at the venue.

References

External links

  

Sports venues in Tokyo
Buildings and structures in Koto, Tokyo
Sports venues completed in 2004
2004 establishments in Japan
Wrestling venues